Mao (written: , , , ,  or ) is a feminine Japanese given name. People with the name include:

, Japanese singer-songwriter
, Japanese figure skater
, Japanese actress
, Japanese singer-songwriter
, Japanese male pianist
, Japanese male footballer
, Japanese actress and voice actress
, Japanese long-distance runner
, Japanese actress
, Japanese curler
, Okinawan photographer and activist
, Japanese judoka
, Japanese long distance runner
, Japanese actress
, Japanese football player
, Japanese junior idol
 Mao Kunii (born 1996), Japanese rhythmic gymnast
, Japanese actress
, Japanese J-pop dancer 
, Japanese professional golfer

Other people
 Mao Zeming (b. 1963), Papua New Guinean politician

Fictional characters
, a Geass-user in the anime series Code Geass: Lelouch of the Rebellion
, a female character in the anime series Blood+
, a character in the anime and manga series Darker than Black
, a character in the video game Shadow Hearts: From The New World
, a character in the video game Tales of Rebirth
, the main character in the video game Disgaea 3
, a character in the video game Shining Wind
 Mao, a character in the film Marock, played by Assaad Bouab
 Mao Mao, a character in the video game Aero Fighters
, aka Satan, the main protagonist of the anime The Devil Is a Part-Timer!
, a secondary character of the anime "The Future Diary" or also known as "Mirai Nikki". 
 Mao Kamitsuki, a character from the fictional idol group Apricot Regulus
 Mao Onigawara, a character in the anime series Ground Defense Force! Mao-chan
 , the main character from the Data Carddass arcade collectable card game and Anime/Tokusatsu, Aikatsu Planet!

Japanese feminine given names